The Akto Turkmen are sub group of the Kyrgyz people who live in Xinjiang, China.  They are now Uyghur speaking and live in Akto County, a county located in the Kizilsu Kyrgyz Autonomous Prefecture.

History 
The Akto claim to be from Samarqand, a city in modern Uzbekistan who settled in the Xinjiang region of China during the 17th century.  The Akto have rebelled against the Chinese government many times since the Qing dynasty.  In 1990, nearly 1,000 Akto Turkmens rebelled against the Chinese government and were mostly detained over separatist charges.  It was organised by the East Turkestan Islamic Party, a Uyghur terrorist group which plans to make Xinjiang independent.

Culture 
The Akto Turkmens are Sunni Muslims who observe both Kyrgyz and Uyghur festivals as well a pre-Islamic traits.  Though they speak Uyghur, the are recognised by the Chinese government as Kyrgyz.  They primarily live in Akto County, as well as two villages outside Akto.  They are skilled shepherds and goat herders.

Language 
The Akto Turkmen speak a distinct dialect of Uyghur known as Aqto Türkmen which is considered by Ethnologue to be a variety of Uyghur under Turkmen influence.  It is part of the Central Uyghur dialects which are the most spoken Uyghur dialects.

References 

Ethnic groups in Xinjiang
Kyrgyz in China
Kizilsu Kyrgyz Autonomous Prefecture